Artem Ivanov or Artyom Ivanov may refer to:

 Artem Ivanov (draughts player) (born 1988), Ukrainian draughts player
 Artem Ivanov (weightlifter) (born 1987), Ukrainian weightlifter